Dhamkee is a 1973 Bollywood drama film directed by Kalpataru. The film stars Vinod Khanna & Kumkum in lead roles.

Cast
Bela Bose   
Subhash Ghai   
Helen   
Imtiaz   
Vinod Khanna   
Kumkum  
Ranjeet   
Jayshree T.   
Meena T.

Soundtrack

External links
 

1973 films
1970s Hindi-language films
1973 drama films
Indian drama films
Hindi-language drama films